Bushra Farrukh (born 16 February 1957), is a Pakistani poet. She was born in Peshawar. She is one of the female Urdu poets of Pakistan. She has served Pakistan Television and Radio Pakistan as an announcer. She is the artist of Khyber-Pakhtunkhwa who has performed in four different languages Urdu, Pashto, Hindko and English at television and radio.  Bushra Farrukh has performed many radio and television programs. All her programs have been enjoyed especially among the youth.

Bushra Farrukh is a poet of Khyber-Pakhtunkhwa and her nine poetry collections have been published.

Literary contributions
 Bohat Gehri Udasi Hai ( Farrukh) 
 Adhuri Mohabbat Ka Poora Safar ( WTO) 
 Ik Qayamat hai lamha e Mojood ( an anthology of Urdu poetry)

Laurels

 Abasin Arts Council Adabi Award 2017-2018
 Sardar Abdur Rab Nishtar Award (gold medal) 2003–2004
 Hindko World Conference Award 2005
 Bazm-e-Bahar-e-Adab Silver Jubilee Award 2005
 City District Government Award 2004
 Farogh Adabi Award 2004
 Rozan International Literary Award 2003
 Taangh Waseep Award 2000
 Khyber College of Commerce Shield 2000
 Azeem Welfare Society Award 1999
 PTV Award 1998 (Best Performance Award) 1987 to 1997
 Moshiqar-e-Aazam Award 1997
 Agfa Award 1997
 Agfa Award 1996
 Frontier Cultural Club Award 1995
 Frontier Arts Council Award (gold medal) 1995
 Meer Arts Society Award 1986
 Frontier Arts Council Award (gold medal) 1982
 Coca-Cola Award 1978
 Sultani Award 1976
 Pakistan Artists Equity Award 1973

Professional career
 Pakistan Television (Peshawar Center):
Served PTV Peshawar Center as an announcer for 10-year and worked as a drama artist for 35 years.
 Radio Pakistan:
Served Radio Pakistan as an announcer, Compare and a drama artist for 35 years.
 Women writer's Forum:
Served Women writer's forum for 3 years as General Secretary and 1-year as its Chief Organizer.
 Business Women Association:
Served Business Women Association for 2-year as Public Relations Officer, Institute of Computer Management Sciences (ICMS).
Served Institute of Computer Management Sciences Hayatabad Peshawar for 1-year as the in charge literary wing ICMS.

Projects
 Currently working on her play "aur hum wafa karte rahe". She is writing as well as directing the play.
 Produced a Pushto serial “”

See also
Urdu poetry
List of Urdu Poets
List of Pakistani actresses

References

1957 births
Living people
People from Peshawar
Pakistani poets
Pakistani women poets
Urdu-language poets from Pakistan
Pakistani radio presenters
Pakistani women radio presenters
PTV Award winners